Kalkara Football Club is a Maltese football club from the seaside village of Kalkara, overlooking the Grand Harbour in Malta, which currently play in the Maltese Amateur League A.They also play in the annual Maltese FA Trophy.

Honours 

 3rd Division Champions :2016/17

References

Football clubs in Malta
Association football clubs established in 2004
2004 establishments in Malta
Kalkara